Werner Hegemann (June 15, 1881, Mannheim – April 12, 1936, New York City) was an internationally known city planner, architecture critic, and author. A leading German intellectual during the Weimar Republic, his criticism of Hitler and the Nazi party required him to leave Germany with his family in 1933. He died in New York City in 1936.

Biography

Hegemann was the son of Ottmar Hegemann (1839-1900), a manufacturer in Mannheim, and Elise Caroline Friedrich Vorster (1846-1911), daughter of Julius Vorster, a founder of Chemische Fabrik Kalk in Cologne. After graduating from Gymnasium Schloss Plön in 1901, Hegemann began college studies in Berlin; studied art history and economics in Paris; economics at the University of Pennsylvania and in Strasbourg, and in 1908 completed his doctorate in economics at Ludwig Maximilian University of Munich. In 1905 he married Alice Hesse (1882-1976) in Berlin. The couple had one child, Ellis, in 1906. After obtaining his Ph.D in 1908, Hegemann went to the United States (with his first wife and child). In the U.S. he was a Philadelphia housing inspector before 1909 work with the Boston-1915 Movement, a five-year plan to develop and improve the Boston area.

Back in Berlin the following year Hegemann was General Secretary of the 1910 Universal City Planning Exhibition held in Berlin in May and June. The exhibition aroused great interest and was reprised in refocused form in Düsseldorf; Hegemann wrote an article about it for a general audience and a two-volume official book.  These city planning exhibitions were the first of their kind: Hegemann was in the right place at the right time to play a formative role in the early development of city planning as a profession.

In 1912 Hegemann accepted an invitation from Frederic C. Howe, Director of the People's Institute in New York, to give lectures on city planning in over 20 American cities. He impressed his American hosts by attaching more importance to city infrastructure and function than to embellished, ornate buildings and monuments. In his lectures he debated the opportunities and dangers of urban development and advised against imitating European models.  When his tour ended in California, he bought a motorcar and toured the west coast up to Seattle. The municipalities of Oakland and Berkeley then engaged him to prepare a comprehensive planning report, published in 1915 as the "Report on a City Plan for the Municipalities of Oakland & Berkeley." Hegemann's report developed a hierarchy of  planning areas and called for the cooperation of urban groups to steer urban development, encouraging the turn from inner-city embellishment to optimizing urban functions. In early 1914 Hegemann embarked by ship on a return voyage to Germany via the Pacific, in order to visit the Far East and Australia.  In Australia that July he boarded a German flagged ship for the final leg of the journey home. World War I broke out when the ship was near Africa, and it dodged English warships for several weeks before being sequestered for months off the coast of Mozambique. In April 1915 Hegemann stowed-away on a Norwegian vessel bound for the United States, where he spent the duration of the war. In 1916, while in the U.S., he was divorced from Alice Hesse.

Hegemann remained in the United States until early 1921. He established "Hegemann & Peets," a firm specializing in city and suburban planning based in Milwaukee, Wisconsin, with landscape architect Elbert Peets. The firm designed the Washington Highlands Historic District, and Wyomissing Park, a "Modern Garden Suburb" in Reading, Pennsylvania. Hegemann and Peets together published "The American Vitruvius: An Architects' Handbook of Civic Art," a "thesaurus" of civic art for architects, commenting on about 1200 examples of the discipline.

In 1918, visiting his friend Fiske Kimball at the University of Michigan, Hegemann met Ida Belle Guthe, daughter of Karl Eugen Guthe. In 1920 the couple married at the bride's home in Ann Arbor, Michigan. Hegemann evidently never considered remaining in the United States, but wished to return to the country of his birth, education, family and friends. In 1921 he returned to Europe with his new bride. After a sojourn in Naples, Italy, in 1922 he designed and built a home in Nikolassee, outside of Berlin. He became editor of Wasmuths Monatshefte für Baukunst, published by Ernst Wasmuth Verlag, known for its international coverage of architecture and Hegemann's incisive critiques. With a literary-polemical style of criticism that stood out sharply from the manifesto style of the moderns, Hegemann opposed formal modernism and academic traditions and favored a moderate modernity. He encouraged people with different views to write to the journal, and facilitated debates among schools of architectural thought. Hegemann also wrote several historical books debunking German heroes, one of which was Napoleon, or Prostration Before the Hero (published in Germany in 1927 with an English translation in 1931), criticizing German writers and leaders for admiring and romanticizing Napoleon. In 1930 Hegemann published the work for which he may be best remembered: Das steinerne Berlin: Geschichte der Grössten Mietkasernenstadt der Welt (Stony Berlin: History of the Largest Tenement City in the World), which combines historical and architectural criticism. In the introduction he wrote, "It is a German illusion to believe in the possibility of creating an intellectual capital as long as the so-called educated people are almost proud of their inadequate understanding of urban planning." In 1931 he made a lecture tour through South America, visiting Argentina, where he attended a local convention on urban planning at Mar del Plata. Hegemann gave a lecture criticising European aesthetics, patterns and planning of this resort city. Back to Germany, he devoted himself increasingly to warnings against the National Socialists in a series of political articles, culminating in the book "Entlarvte Geschichte" ("History Unmasked").

In February 1933, shortly after Hitler took power and contemporaneously with the Reichstag Fire, Hegemann published his book, "Entlarvte Geschichte," criticizing Hitler and the Nazi Party. He left Germany on the evening before publication. The book was dedicated (sarcastically) to Adolf Hitler, causing Nazi bookstores to promote it for a week or so prior to discovery of Hegemann's ruse (and Nazi anger). In May, 1933 he was denounced by the Nazis as an "Historical Forger," and his books were burned in the Nazi book burnings. After several months in Geneva and France, Hegemann was invited by Alvin Johnson to teach urban planning at The New School for Social Research in New York beginning in November 1933. That October Hegemann left Europe for the United States with his wife and four young children. He was one of many intellectuals essentially exiled by Nazi Germany'f hostility and persecution in the 1930s. Upon arriving in New York City on November 4, 1933 Hegemann opined that the German people would not tolerate Hitler for more than two more years. He began lecturing at the New School and organizing assistance for intellectuals and scholars detained by the Nazis in Germany. In 1935 he also began teaching at Columbia University. Also in 1935 the Nazis seized Hegemann's house in Nikolassee, and in 1938 revoked his doctorate. Meanwhile, he made efforts to stir public opinion in the case of associates who remained in Germany, then unable to leave, such as Carl von Ossietzky, another German critic of Hitler, who was arrested and imprisoned by the Nazi's in the same month that Hegemann left Germany. He also wrote in support of Roosevelt's New Deal. 

Hegemann saw the rise of Hitler in Germany as emerging from a historical context of Germans celebrating and idealizing strong men -- a phenomenon that he had written about repeatedly during the decade leading to Hitler's rise to power. Characteristically overstating the point, he criticized a century or more of "craving for submission" by German professors, bureaucrats and professionals, and observed that if Hitler ever decided to stop enslaving the nation, he would be "overwhelmed by an irresistible rush into ever deeper submission" by those with "collusive attitudes toward war-hungry German nationalism." Similarly, in 1934 Hegemann viewed the persecution of Jews in Germany as "in conformity with Old Prussian tradition" of antisemitism, and as consistent with the German aristocracy's disregard for "intellect and higher culture." Writing from the perspective of 1934, Hegemann recognized in Hitler a fanatic, but did not believe he could be taken seriously for long. Hegemann never imagined that five years later Hitler would seize total control of Germany and begin a world war resulting in the deaths of tens of millions of people.

Hegemann's early years in the United States, along with his strong education and broad interests, made him an intermediary between architects and city planners throughout Europe and on both sides of the Atlantic. In particular, his The American Vitruvius refers extensively to European design, taking many examples from his book on the Berlin 1910 exhibition, while in Amerikanische Architektur und Stadtbaukunst he informs German architects of American solutions. However, his emphasis on urban planning rather than purely formal considerations and possibly his having not been present during the development in Europe of the Modern Movement in architecture put him at odds with modernists. For example, in 1929 he was forced to retract an accusation that Martin Wagner's primary activity as chief of city planning for Berlin was funneling architectural commissions to extremist friends, and he labeled Le Corbusier's Ville Contemporaine project for transforming Paris "only vieux jeu" (old hat), sarcastically predicting that it was likely to be realized, 
[not] because [the skyscrapers] are desirable, healthy, beautiful, and reasonable from the perspective of urban planning but because they are theatrical, romantic, unreasonable, and generally harmful, and because it is part of the money-making activities of a metropolis, in what is literally the world's most international city, Paris, to serve the need for sensation and the vices of native and imported fools.

Der Gerettete Christus

Hegemann authored the book Der Gerettete Christus (Translated as Christ Rescued) in 1933. The book discusses a variant of the swoon hypothesis that Jesus did not die on the cross but only fainted.

Death

In New York in early 1936, Hegemann became ill, first diagnosed with Sciatica and then hospitalized with apparent pneumonia. His illness developed during a time of great stress, as Hegemann sought to support his family of four young children after being required to leave all his assets (and his treasured library and work papers) behind in Germany. While bed-ridden at Doctors Hospital (Manhattan) he worked on his last book, the three-volume "City Planning, Housing," intended to supplement and update The American Vitruvius. Eventually completed by two co-editors, the last volume appeared in 1938. Hegemann died on April 12 1936, at age 55. The treating doctor opined that the cause of death was tuberculous meningitis.

Selected works
 Der Städtebau nach den Ergebnissen der Allgemeinen Städtebau-Ausstellung in Berlin, nebst einem anhang: Die Internationale Städtebau-Ausstellung in Düsseldorf; 600 wiedergaben des Bilder- und Planmaterials der beiden Ausstellungen, mit Förderung durch die königlichen preussischen Ministerien des Inneren, des Handels und der öffentlichen Arbeiten, sowie durch die Städte Berlin, Charlottenburg, Rixdorf, Schöneberg, Wilmersdorf, Potsdam, Spandau, Lichtenberg und Düsseldorf. Herausgegeben im Auftrage der Arbeitsausschüsse von Dr. Werner Hegemann, Generalsekretär der Städtebau-Ausstellungen in Berlin und Düsseldorf. 2 vols. Berlin: Wasmuth, 1911, 1913. 
 (with Elbert Peets) The American Vitruvius: An Architects' Handbook of Civic Art. New York: Architectural Book Publishing, 1922.
 Amerikanische Architektur und Stadtbaukunst: ein Überblick über den heutigen Stand der amerikanischen Baukunst in ihrer Beziehung zum Städtebau. Berlin: Wasmuth, 1925. 
 Das Steinerne Berlin: Geschichte der grössten Mietkasernenstadt der Welt. Berlin: Kiepenhauer, 1930. 
 Der Gerettete Christus, 1928 (Translated from the German by Gerald Griffin as Christ Rescued, 1933).
 Mar del Plata: El Balneario y El Urbanismo Moderno. Mar del Plata, 1931. (in Spanish)
 Entlarvte Geschichte. Aus Nacht zum Licht. Von Arminius bis Hitler. Leipzig: Hegner, 1933. 
 City planning, Housing. 3 vols. Vols. 2 and 3 with William W. Forster and Robert C. Weinberg. New York: Architectural Book Publishing, 1936–38. OCLC 837328

References

Sources
 Caroline Flick, Werner Hegemann (1881–1936): Stadtplanung, Architektur, Politik: ein Arbeitsleben in Europa und den USA. Munich: Saur, 2005 
 Christiane Crasemann Collins, "Werner Hegemann and the Search for Universal Urbanism," New York: Norton, 2005.

External links
 

1881 births
1936 deaths
American architecture writers
American male non-fiction writers
American urban planners
The New School faculty
Columbia University faculty
Ludwig Maximilian University of Munich alumni
German architecture writers
German urban planners
People of the German Empire
People of the Weimar Republic
German emigrants to the United States
German male non-fiction writers
Swoon hypothesis
Tuberculosis deaths in New York (state)